The PS Lady Elgin was a wooden-hulled sidewheel steamship that sank in Lake Michigan off the fledgling town of Port Clinton, Illinois, whose geography is now divided between Highland Park and  Highwood, Illinois, after she was rammed in a gale by the schooner Augusta in the early hours of September 8, 1860. The passenger manifest was lost with the collision, but the sinking of Lady Elgin resulted in the loss of about 300 lives in what was called "one of the greatest marine horrors on record".  Four years after the disaster, a new rule required sailing vessels to carry running lights. The Lady Elgin disaster remains the greatest loss of life on open water in the history of the Great Lakes.

In 1994, a process began to list the shipwreck on the National Register of Historic Places.  After it was determined to be eligible for listing in 1999, the process ended after an objection by the owner, so the shipwreck is not listed on the Register.

Career

Lady Elgin was built in 1851 in Buffalo, New York, at a cost of $95,000. She was named after the wife of Lord Elgin, Canada's Governor General from 1847 to 1854. During her time, the wooden-hulled sidewheeler was one of the most elegantly appointed passenger ships plying the Great Lakes. Rated a first-class steamer, she was a favorite with the traveling public. Early in her career she ran between Buffalo and Chicago, then later between Chicago and Collingwood, Ontario. For many of her later seasons, she plied the route between Chicago and other Lake Michigan ports and Lake Superior.

During Lady Elgins career she was involved in numerous accidents. She sank and was repaired in 1854 after striking a rock at Manitowoc, Wisconsin. In 1855, she was towed to Chicago after an accident to her machinery. In 1857, she was damaged by fire. In June 1858, she struck a reef at Copper Harbor, Michigan. In August 1858, she was stranded on Au Sable Point Reef in Lake Superior. In October 1859, she was towed to Marquette, Michigan after breaking her crossbeam. In November 1859, she was towed again when her crank pin broke near Point Iroquois, Michigan. Her final blow came in 1860 when she was rammed by the wooden schooner Augusta ten miles from shore. In 1899, Great Lakes historian J.B. Mansfield called Lady Elgin'''s sinking "one of the greatest marine horrors on record".

Final voyage

On the night of September 6, 1860 Lady Elgin left Milwaukee, Wisconsin, from the Dooley, Martin, Dousman, and Company Dock, for Chicago, carrying members of Milwaukee's Union Guard to hear a campaign speech by Stephen A. Douglas, Abraham Lincoln's opponent, although there is no clear historical evidence that Douglas actually appeared. Three hundred men and women spent the day of September 7 listening to political speeches followed by an evening of entertainment by a German brass band on board Lady Elgin. On the return trip that night, the brightly lit Lady Elgin was steaming through Lake Michigan against gale force winds when she was rammed by the schooner Augusta of Oswego. Augusta was sailing using only a single white light, mounted on a five-foot Samson on the bow, and did not attempt, or was unable, to turn to avoid the collision in the gale.  On the morning of the collision (September 8) at 2:30 am, Augusta rammed the port side of Lady Elgin, damaging her own bowsprit and headgear, while holing the latter ship below the waterline.

Concerned that she was damaged and believing Lady Elgin had got safely away, Augusta made for Chicago. Aboard Lady Elgin, Captain Wilson ordered that cattle and cargo be thrown overboard to lighten the load and raise the gaping hole in Lady Elgin's port side above water level while the steward was down in the coal bunker trying to stop the leak with mattresses. Captain Wilson ordered a lifeboat lowered on the starboard side to check the extent of the damage but it never regained the steamer. Within twenty minutes, Lady Elgin broke apart, and all but the bow section rapidly sank. The night was lit up at intervals by flashes of lightning showing the scattered wreckage.

Two boats with a total of 18 persons reached shore. In addition, fourteen people were saved on a large raft and many others on parts of the wreckage. Over 300 people died and 98 saved. The drummer of the German band, Charles Beverung, saved himself by using his large bass drum as a life preserver. Survivors reported the heroic efforts of Captain Wilson to save about 300 persons collected on a raft. When day broke, between 350 and 400 passengers and crew were drifting in stormy waters, holding on to anything they could, many only to be pulled under by breakers near shore.

Students from Northwestern University and Garrett Biblical Institute were watching the shore on the morning of September 8, looking for survivors.  One of the students, Edward Spencer, is credited with rescuing 17 passengers over the course of six hours.  He sustained injuries during his rescue efforts that left him an invalid for the rest of his life.  A plaque in his honor was first placed in the Northwestern University Gymnasium, and is now housed in the Northwestern University Library.

About 300 people died in the sinking, including Captain Wilson, who was lost trying to save two women when he was caught by the surf and forced into the rocks. Most were from Milwaukee with the majority of those from the Irish communities, including nearly all of Milwaukee's Irish Union Guard. So many Irish-American political operatives died that day that the disaster has been credited with transferring the balance of political power in Milwaukee "from the Irish to the Germans".  It is said that more than 1000 children were orphaned by the tragedy, however research shows that there were fewer than 40 children orphaned. The Lady Elgin disaster remains the greatest loss of life on open water in the history of the Great Lakes.

Memorials

A Wisconsin historical marker in the historic third ward in Milwaukee commemorates the tragedy. Calvary Cemetery in Milwaukee has a monument dedicated to the Lady Elgin disaster and the many lost in the tragedy who are buried there. 

Songwriter Henry Clay Work penned the memorial song "Lost on the Lady Elgin" in 1861. For many years in central Canada this song was sung at family gatherings and social occasions.  

In 2009, the Milwaukee Irish Heritage and Cultural Center launched a $200,000 fundraising campaign for a mammoth, two-story bronze memorial statue for the Lady Elgin disaster.

Maritime rulings
Following the sinking, Lady Elgin's owner, Gurdon Saltonstall Hubbard, received a $12,000 payment from his insurance company, but neither he nor the insurance company accepted abandonment of the ship.  The captain of Augusta, Darius Malott, was arrested and tried in Chicago, but found not guilty of navigational negligence.  A coroner's jury declared his second-mate, Mr. Budge, to be incompetent, and his crew to be of principal blame. However, Professor Mason and Lieutenant Bartlett asserted that a principal cause of the collision was the lack of a $15 lantern on the Augusta - see Polytechnic Association of the American Institute, Scientific American, New Series, Vol 3, Issue 14, page 214.(September 29, 1860). Steamboat historian Peter Charlebois noted that, after the investigation, Captain Malott and Lady Elgin's crew and owners were absolved of any blame.  He reported:  The judgement was based on a law that not only gave sail the right of way over steam, but did not require sailing vessels to carry running lights.  Apparently Augusta had sighted the passenger steamer twenty minutes before the collision but in the rain had misjudged the distance between them.  Four years after the disaster, in 1864, a new ruling was made requiring sailing vessels to carry running lights.  Since there were still nearly 1,900 ships under sail by 1870 the regulations were long overdue. 

Wreck
The wreck of Lady Elgin was discovered in 1989 off Highwood, Illinois by Harry Zych. Zych was awarded ownership in 1999 after a protracted legal battle. Divers must obtain permission from Zych and Lady Elgin'' Foundation, and are expected to observe the preservation laws governing historic sites. The Underwater Archaeological Society of Chicago undertook a reconnaissance survey of the wreck site in 1992.

See also
List of maritime disasters in the 19th century

References

External links

The Great Lakes Shipwreck File
New York Times account of the sinking
Descendant of Lady Elgin victims dives to wreck site in Illinois

Great Lakes ships
History of Chicago
History of Wisconsin
Maritime incidents in September 1860
Transportation in Milwaukee
Ships sunk in collisions
1851 ships
Passenger ships of the United States
Paddle steamers of the United States
Highwood, Illinois
Shipwrecks of Lake Michigan
Ships built in Buffalo, New York
Wreck diving sites